Passion Cove is an erotic anthology drama series which featured softcore sexual encounters and aired from March 2000 to April 2001 on Cinemax.

Summary
In each episode, guest stars rent the beach house in a fictional seaside resort Passion Cove, usually for a weekend and magically find love where they were looking for lust. The beach house has a backyard swimming pool and adjacent beach that provide continuity to the 26 episodes.

Series star Caroline Ambrose appears periodically as Samantha, the property's rental agent, but plays no role in the individual stories.

Episodes

Season 1
 "The Vibe" – March 3, 2000
 "In Too Deep" – March 10, 2000
 "Lights! Camera! Action!" – March 17, 2000
 "Blind Date" – March 24, 2000
 "Payday" – March 31, 2000
 "Behind the Scenes" – April 7, 2000
 "The Gift" – April 14, 2000
 "The Getaway" – April 21, 2000
 "Lost Cowboy" – April 28, 2000
 "Music of Lust" – May 5, 2000
 "Rising Stars" – May 12, 2000
 "Sorority Reunion" – May 19, 2000
 "Watching Linda" – May 26, 2000

Season 2
 "Ten Years Later" – February 2, 2001
 "Enchanted Weekend" – February 9, 2001
 "The Bet" – February 16, 2001
 "Practice What You Preach" – February 23, 2001
 "House Call" – March 2, 2001
 "Over By Sunday" – March 9, 2001
 "Where Have You Been All My Life?" – March 16, 2001
 "The Surrogate" – March 23, 2001
 "Silent Night" – March 30, 2001
 "Best Friends" – April 6, 2001
 "Ghostly Passion" – April 13, 2001
 "Discreet Affair" – April 20, 2001
 "The Best Revenge" – April 27, 2001

In popular culture
In the 2007 episode "Chuck Versus the Alma Mater" of the comedy spy programme Chuck, the possibility of playing Passion Cove on every TV in an electronics store is uttered as a threat.

External links 
 
 

2000 American television series debuts
2001 American television series endings
2000s American anthology television series
Cinemax original programming
Television series by Warner Bros. Television Studios
2000s American comedy-drama television series
English-language television shows
Erotic television series
Television series by Alta Loma Entertainment